= HPMPA =

Names
- Preferred IUPAC name ({[(2S)-1-(6-Amino-9H-purin-9-yl)-3-hydroxypropan-2-yl]oxy}methyl)phosphonic acid

Identifiers
CAS Number	92999-29-6
3D model (JSmol)	Interactive image
ChEMBL	ChEMBL286534
ChemSpider	65210
PubChem CID	72253
UNII	CJC8PO1KQ3
CompTox Dashboard (EPA)	DTXSID20239219
- InChI: InChI=1S/C9H14N5O5P/c10-8-7-9(12-3-11-8)14(4-13-7)1-6(2-15)19-5-20(16,17)18/h3-4,6,15H,1-2,5H2,(H2,10,11,12)(H2,16,17,18)/t6-/m0/s1 Key: FRPXSOOHWNMLPH-LURJTMIESA-N
- SMILES: c1nc(c2c(n1)n(cn2)C[C@@H](CO)OCP(=O)(O)O)N

Properties
Chemical formula	C_{9}H_{14}N_{5}O_{5}P
Molar mass	303.215 g·mol^{−1}
- Except where otherwise noted, data are given for materials in their standard state (at 25 °C [77 °F], 100 kPa). Infobox references

HPMPA is an experimental broad spectrum antiviral.
